Annexin A7 is a protein that in humans is encoded by the ANXA7 gene.

Annexin VII is a member of the annexin family of calcium-dependent phospholipid binding proteins. The Annexin VII gene contains 14 exons and spans approximately 34 kb of DNA.  An alternatively spliced cassette exon results in two mRNA transcripts of 2.0 and 2.4 kb which are predicted to generate two protein isoforms differing in their N-terminal domain.  The alternative splicing event is tissue specific and the mRNA containing the cassette exon is prevalent in brain, heart and skeletal muscle.  The  transcripts also differ in their 3'-non coding regions by the use of two alternative poly(A) signals.  The selection of poly(A) signals is independent of the mRNA splicing pattern. ~Annexin VII encodes a protein with a molecular weight of approximately 51 kDa with a unique, highly hydrophobic N-terminal domain of 167 amino acids and a conserved C-terminal region of 299 amino acids. The latter domain is composed of alternating hydrophobic and hydrophilic segments. Structural analysis of the protein suggests that Annexin VII is a membrane binding protein with diverse properties including voltage-sensitive calcium channel activity, ion selectivity and membrane fusion.

Interactions
ANXA7 has been shown to interact with ALG2 and SRI.

References

External links

Further reading